The Bardoli Pradesh Kelavani Mandal (BPKM) is an education trust established in 1960 with the aim of imparting of higher education opportunities in and around the rural area. BPKM has started a self-financed engineering college named as Chhotubhai Gopalbhai Patel Institute of Technology (CGPIT) under the roof of Uka Tarsadia University (UTU) in the year 2009. Under direction of Dr. Rajkumar Patil, CGPIT offers B.Tech. programmes in disciplines like Electronics & Communication, Electrical, Civil, Computer, Information Technology, Mechanical, Automobile and Chemical Engineering. CGPIT also offers M.Tech. programmes in disciplines like Electronics & Communication, Civil, Computer, Information Technology and Mechanical Engineering. Ph.D. programmes are also carried out by CGPIT in the disciplines like Electronics & Communication, Civil, Computer, and Mechanical Engineering.

History
Chotu bhai Gopal bhai Patel Institute of Technology was established in 2009 with permission from the All India Council for Technical Education. It is affiliated with Uka Tarsadia University (UTU).
CGPIT has to do everything with Technological and Engineering education and many other things are important such as various Events.
Such as NAVALI NAVRATRI, FRESHER'S PARTY, ANNUAL CULTURAL FUNCTION ( Two times in year) etc..

Departments
C. G. Patel Institute of Technology has following major Departments:

 Department of Automobile Engineering
 Department of Chemical Engineering
 Department of Civil Engineering
 Department of Computer Engineering
 Department of Electrical Engineering
 Department of Electronics and Communication Engineering
 Department of Information Technology
 Department of Mechanical Engineering

Various Programmes at C. G. Patel Institute of Technology

Ph.D. Programmes
 Computer Engineering
 Electronics & Communications Engineering 
 Mechanical Engineering
 Civil Engineering

Masters of Technology (M.Tech.)

 Structural Engineering
 Soil Mechanics and Foundation Engineering
 Environmental Engineering
 Electronics and Communication Engineering
 Computer Engineering
 Information Technology
 Power System
 Automobile Technology
 Thermal System Design

Bachelor of Technology (B.Tech.)

 Automobile Engineering
 Artificial Intelligence and Data Science
 Artificial Intelligence and Machine Learning
 Chemical Engineering
 Civil Engineering
 Computer Engineering
 Electrical Engineering
 Electronics and Communication Engineering
 Electronics and Electrical Engineering
 Information Technology
 Information and Communication Technology
 Mechatronics
 Mechanical Engineering

Diploma in Engineering
 Electrical Engineering
 Mechanical Engineering
 Civil Engineering
 Computer Engineering

References 

Universities and colleges in Gujarat
Surat district